Kaja Eržen (born 21 August 1994) is a Slovenian professional footballer who plays as a right back for Serie A club Fiorentina and the Slovenia women's national team. On 9 July 2021, it was announced that Erzen joined Napoli.

Club career
Eržen began her career as a 14-year old midfielder with Slovenian club Velesovo in 2008. Eržen stayed with Velesovo for three seasons, helping the club achieve promotion to Slovenia's first division. Eržen then moved to Pomurje in the summer of 2011, where she began to score goals at a prolific rate. She won the Slovenian league and cup double as well as two consecutive league winner's medals during her stay with the Pormuje. After a run of games where Eržen scored 27 goals in 19 starts, she decided to move abroad to Austrian club Carinthians in 2014.

Eržen struggled to establish herself in her lone season at Carinthians and took up the offer to join compatriot coach Boris Ljubič, as well as seven fellow Slovenian teammates, at LUV Graz for the ÖFB-Frauenliga 2015–16 season. The team clinched seventh position in the league and saved themselves from relegation, before Eržen chose to return to her native Slovenia and sign with Olimpia Ljubljana for the 2016–17 season.

It was with Olimpia Ljubljana that Eržen rediscovered her goalscoring touch in attack, scoring 22 goals in 19 starts and ranking as the team's second-highest goalscorer for the season. Her attacking prowess caught the attention of Italian Serie A club Tavagnacco across the border, and Erzen signed for the Italian team in July 2017.

During her two seasons with Tavagnacco, Eržen played mostly as a winger and helped her side compete near the top of the Serie A table as well as reaching the Coppa Italia semi-final. During her second season with Tavagnacco, Eržen would score against Roma in a league match on 31 October 2018. Eržen's goals and performances from the wing captured the attention of Roma, who then signed the Slovenian in the summer of 2019.

During her stay with Roma, Eržen converted herself to a full-back role for the Giallorosse. She now plays that position for both club and country, and made an appearance in the 2021 Coppa Italia final for Roma. Roma won that Coppa Italia final in a penalty shootout victory over AC Milan, which saw Eržen become a part of Roma's club history as she helped the club achieve their first major trophy win on the women's side of the game.

International career 
Eržen has been capped for the Slovenia national team, appearing for the team during the 2019 FIFA Women's World Cup qualifying cycle.

References

External links
 
 
 

1994 births
Living people
Slovenian women's footballers
Slovenia women's international footballers
Women's association football defenders
A.S. Roma (women) players
U.P.C. Tavagnacco players
S.S.D. Napoli Femminile players
Fiorentina Women's F.C. players
Serie A (women's football) players
Slovenian expatriate sportspeople in Italy
Expatriate women's footballers in Italy